Kosmos 1217 ( meaning Cosmos 1217) was a Soviet US-K missile early warning satellite which was launched in 1980 as part of the Soviet military's Oko programme. The satellite was designed to identify missile launches using optical telescopes and infrared sensors.

Kosmos 1217 was launched from Site 41/1 at Plesetsk Cosmodrome in the Russian SSR. A Molniya-M carrier rocket with a 2BL upper stage was used to perform the launch, which took place at 10:53 UTC on 24 October 1980. The launch successfully placed the satellite into a molniya orbit. It subsequently received its Kosmos designation, and the international designator 1980-085A. The United States Space Command assigned it the Satellite Catalog Number 12032.

See also

 1980 in spaceflight
 List of Kosmos satellites (1001–1250)
 List of Oko satellites
 List of R-7 launches (1980-1984)

References

Kosmos satellites
Oko
Spacecraft launched in 1980
Spacecraft launched by Molniya-M rockets